The Thomson MO5 is a home computer introduced in France in June 1984 to compete against systems such as the ZX Spectrum and Commodore 64. It had a release price of 2390 FF. 

At the same time, Thomson also released the up-market Thomson TO7/70 machine. The MO5 was not sold in vast quantities outside France and was largely discontinued in favour of the improved Thomson MO6 in 1986. 

MO5s were used as educational tools in French schools for a period (see Computing for All, a French government plan to introduce computers to the country's pupils), and could be used as a "nano-machine" terminal for the "Nanoréseau" educational network. 

The computer boots directly to the built-in Microsoft BASIC interpreter (MO5 Basic 1.0).

Specifications
The Thomson MO5 runs on a Motorola 6809E processor clocked at 1 MHz and features 48 KB of RAM (16 KB used as video memory, 32KB as free user RAM) and 16KB of ROM (4KB for the monitor and 12KB for the BASIC interpreter).

Graphics were generated by a EFGJ03L (or MA4Q-1200) gate array capable of 40×25 text display and a resolution of 320 x 200 pixels with 16 colours (limited by 8x1 pixel colour attribute areas).. The hardware colour palette is 4-bit RGBI, with 8 basic RGB colours and a intensity bit (called P for "Pastel") that controlled saturation ("saturated" or "pastel"). In memory, the bit order was PBGR. The desaturated colours were obtained by mixing of the original RGB components within the video hardware. This is done by a PROM circuit, where a two bit mask controls colour mixing ratios of 0%, 33%, 66% and 100% of the saturated hue.  This approach allows the display of Orange instead of "desaturated white", and Gray instead of "desaturated black".

According to the values specified on the computer's technical manual (“Manuel Technique du MO5”, p. 11-19), the hardware palette was:

Displayed colors are only approximate due to different transfer and color spaces used on web pages (sRGB) and analog video (BT.601)

Video RAM was 16KB. As common on home computers designed to be connected to an ordinary TV screen, the 320 x 200 pixels active area doesn't cover the entire screen, and is surrounded by a border. The video output is RGB on a SCART connector, with the refresh rate being 625-line compatible 50Hz.

Audio is limited to 1-bit square wave tones, outputted via the TV using the SCART connector. The tape player's output is also routed to the computer's sound output.

The keyboard has 58 keys and includes a reset button.

The machine used cassette tapes for file storage, played on a proprietary player connected using a 5-pin DIN connector.

Expansion
A cartridge port was available. A RAM expansion adding extra 64 KB and a "Nanoréseau" network card could be plugged into it, but was incompatible with early MO5 machines.

Software
Around 200 software titles are known to exist for the MO5.

Variants
An improved version, named Thomson MO5E ("E" for "Export", a model designed for foreign markets) was presented in 1985. It had a different casing featuring a mechanical keyboard, a parallel port, two joystick ports, an internal PAL modulator and an integrated power supply. Sound was also improved, with four voices and seven octaves.

The Thomson MO5NR ("NR" for "Nanoréseau", a network standard - see Computing for All) was introduced in 1986 and added a 58 key AZERTY keyboard and an integrated "Nanoréseau" network controller. Memory was expanded to 128K and the machine came with a new version of BASIC (Microsoft Basic 128 1.0). Graphics were improved by the use of the Thomson EF9369 graphics chip, and the MO5NR could generate 4096 colors, and display up to 16 depending on the resolution used: 320 x 200 with 16 colors (with proximity limitations), 640 x 200 with 2 colors, 320 x 200 with 4 colors, 160 x 200 with 16 colors, 320 x 200 with 3 colors and 1 transparency level, two pages of 320 x 200 with 2 colors, 160 x 200 with 5 colors and 3 transparency levels. Sound was also updated to four voices and five octaves.

See also 

 Computing for All, a French government plan to introduce computers to the country's pupils

References

External links
DCMOTO: PC emulator for Thomson MO5, MO5E, MO5NR, MO6, T9000, TO7, TO7/70, TO8, TO8D, TO9, TO9+ and Olivetti Prodest PC128. Comprehensive software and documentation are also available.
MO5 at Old-Computers.com

6809-based home computers
Thomson computers
Computer science education in France
Computing for All